Holy Hell may refer to:
Holy Hell (Rob Rock album), 2005
Holy Hell (Noun album), 2010
Holy Hell (Architects album), 2018
Holy Hell: A Memoir of Faith, Devotion, and Pure Madness, a memoir by Gail Tredwell
Holy Hell (film), a 2016 documentary film about the Buddhafield cult